Oļegs Meļehs (born 24 March 1982) is a Latvian former professional road cyclist. In 2004 and 2009 he won the Latvian National Road Race Championships.

In 2010 Meļehs suffered a serious back injury.<ref>Šaušalīgu kritienu Itālijā piedzīvojis Latvijas čempions riteņbraukšanā Meļehs</ref

Palmares

2003
3rd National Road Race Championships
2004
1st  National Road Race Championships
1st  National Time Trial Championships
2005
2nd National Time Trial Championships
2006
2nd National Road Race Championships
2nd National Time Trial Championships
2007
2nd National Road Race Championships
2nd National Time Trial Championships
3rd De Vlaamse Pijl
2008
1st Grand Prix of Moscow
2nd National Time Trial Championships
2009
1st  National Road Race Championships

References

1982 births
Living people
Latvian male cyclists
Sportspeople from Riga